Ed Jenkins may refer to:

 Ed Jenkins (politician) (1933–2012), Edgar Jenkins, U.S. Representative from Georgia
 Ed Jenkins (American football) (born 1950), Edward Jenkins, former American football wide receiver
Ed Jenkins, fictional protagonist of a series of novelettes by Erle Stanley Gardner
 Ed Jenkins (rugby union) (born 1986), Australian rugby union player

See also
Edward Jenkins (disambiguation)